196 Philomela is a large and bright main-belt asteroid. It is an S-type asteroid. 

It was discovered by C. H. F. Peters on May 14, 1879, in Clinton, New York and named after Philomela, the woman who became a nightingale in Greek mythology.

In the late 1990s, a network of astronomers worldwide gathered light curve data that was ultimately used to derive the spin states and shape models of 10 new asteroids, including 196 Philomela. The shape model for this asteroid is described as asymmetrical and smooth, while the light curve varies by up to 0.4 in magnitude.

To date there have been two reported Philomelian stellar occultations.

References

External links 
 
 

Background asteroids
Philomela
Philomela
S-type asteroids (Tholen)
S-type asteroids (SMASS)
18790514
Objects observed by stellar occultation